Theodore Eisfeld (April 11, 1816, Wolfenbüttel, Duchy of Brunswick – 16 September 1882, Wiesbaden) was a conductor, most notably of the New York Philharmonic Society, which became the New York Philharmonic.

Biography
Eisfeld's chief instructor in musical composition was Carl Gottlieb Reissiger, of Dresden.  Between 1839 and 1843 he served as Kapellmeister of the Court Theatre at Wiesbaden.  He came to New York in 1848, and in 1849 was the first man chosen by the New York Philharmonic Society to be sole conductor for an entire season (prior to this time it had been customary for several musicians to share the conducting duties).  He began the custom of giving an annual Christmas performance of Handel's Messiah. He also introduced the first regular concerts of chamber music in New York.

From 1849 through the 1865/1866 season, when he resigned, Eisfeld often served as conductor of the New York Philharmonic Society.  In this period it was customary for the conductor to change from season to season, sometimes with two men sharing the duties.  On 18 February 1851, he began a series of quartet concerts, the first being given  at Hope Chapel.  Eisfeld was also the first conductor of the Brooklyn Philharmonic Society, which was founded in 1857.  He continued in this position, alternating with Theodore Thomas between 1862 and 1865, before Thomas took over. This period also saw the composition of some brief works by Eisfeld.

On Eisfeld's return trip from a visit to Europe in September 1858, he was one of the few survivors of the burning of the steamship  where he was lashed to a platform and so drifted on the ocean, without food, for nearly two days and nights. Eisfeld never recovered from this extraordinary prostration, returning to Germany in 1866, and remained there until his death in Wiesbaden at 66.

In his autobiography, Theodore Thomas described Eisfeld as follows:

Conductors of the New York Philharmonic Society, 1849 - 1865
 1849-1854 Eisfeld
 1854-1855 Eisfeld and Henry Timm
 1855-1856 Carl Bergmann
 1856-1858 Eisfeld
 1858-1859 Bergmann
 1859-1865 Bergmann and Eisfeld

Notes

References
 
Opera Almanac

External links

Bibliography
 

1816 births
1882 deaths
American conductors (music)
American male conductors (music)
German conductors (music)
German male conductors (music)
German emigrants to the United States
Music directors of the New York Philharmonic
19th-century conductors (music)
19th-century American musicians
People from Wolfenbüttel
People from the Duchy of Brunswick
19th-century German musicians